Alexander Erskine, 3rd Earl of Kellie (c. 1615–1677) was a Scottish soldier and peer.

Biography
Alexander Erskine inherited the title after the death of his brother Thomas in 1643.

The earl was a staunch Royalist, fighting as Colonel of Foot for Fife and Kinross and in 1648 was involved in an attempt to rescue the King. He was then sent to the Netherlands to fight for Charles II and was eventually captured at the Battle of Worcester in 1651, after which he spent many years of imprisonment. His estates were confiscated by the Commonwealth under the provisions of Cromwell's Act of Grace.

After the restoration of the monarchy in 1660 he was appointed governor of the fort and town of Ayr, lieutenant-colonel of the guards and in 1661 he became a member of the Privy Council.

Family
Alexander Erskine was the son of Alexander Erskine (died 1633) and Anne Seton. He inherited the title after the death of his brother Thomas in 1643. He married twice ; firstly in 1661 in Holland to Anna Kilpatrick, daughter of Lt. Gen. Kilpatrick, Governor of the Bush and secondly in 1665 to Mary Dalzeil, daughter of Sir John Dalzeil. By his first wife he had a daughter Ann and by the second two daughters, Elizabeth and Mary and a son Alexander who succeeded him as the 4th Earl of Kellie

Notes

References
 
 thepeerage.com
 Erskine clan

1677 deaths
3
Alexander
Year of birth uncertain